The Christian-Democratic People's Party (PPCD) is a Christian-democratic political party in Moldova. The party was led by Iurie Roșca from 1994 until 2011. Until 2005, the PPCD and the (Moldovan) National Liberal Party were the main political organizations in the country supporting the unification of Moldova and Romania. After the PPCD began supporting the anti-unification Communist President Vladimir Voronin, the party has lost its unionist credentials while other parties such as the Liberal Party have taken over the pro-Romanian ideological space. The party has had very poor results in all subsequent elections. Since April 2005, the PPCD has lost several deputies, mayors, councillors and members to the liberal-democratic parties. The PPCD was an informal coalition partner of the Party of Communists of the Republic of Moldova from 2005–2009.

History 

It is the successor of the Democratic Movement of Moldova (1988–1989), Popular Front of Moldova (1989–1992), and the Christian Democratic Popular Front (1992–1999). In March 2005, the party became an observer member of the European People's Party.

The 2002 one-month suspension of party's activities was found to be in violation of its freedoms of assembly and association by the European Court of Human Rights in 2006.

Election results

Parliament

References

External links 
Official website 
Election results at e-democracy.md

Article 11 of the European Convention on Human Rights
European Court of Human Rights cases involving Moldova
Political parties established in 1999
Conservative parties in Moldova
Eastern Orthodox political parties
Christian democratic parties in Europe
1999 establishments in Moldova
European Christian Political Movement
Romanian nationalism in Moldova